Shadow of Doubt is the third album by Skrew, released on March 25, 1996 through Metal Blade Records.

Track listing

Personnel 
Skrew
Chadwick Davis – drums
Adam Grossman – vocals, guitar, programming, cover art
Bobby Gustafson – guitar
Robb Lampman – bass guitar
Jim Vollentine – keyboards, programming, cover art
Production and additional personnel
Neil Kernon – production, recording
Bill Metoyer – mixing

References

External links 
 

1996 albums
Metal Blade Records albums
Skrew albums